An inside job  is a crime committed by a person in a position of trust, or with the help of someone either employed by the victim or entrusted with access to the victim's affairs or premises.

Inside Job may also refer to:

Books 

 Inside Job (novella), a 2005 novella by Connie Willis

Film 

 Inside Job (1946 film), a 1946 film noir directed by Jean Yarborough
 Inside Job (2010 film), a 2010 documentary film about the financial crisis of 2007–2010 by Charles H. Ferguson

Television 

 The Alpha Caper (also known as The Inside Job), a 1973 crime thriller made-for-TV movie
 Inside Job (2014 TV series), a reality show on TNT
 Inside Job (2021 TV series), an adult animated Netflix original series created by Shion Takeuchi with Alex Hirsch as executive producer
 "Inside Job", a 1994 episode of Melody Rules
 "The Inside Job" (SpongeBob SquarePants), a 2009 episode of SpongeBob SquarePants
 "The Inside Job", a 2010 episode of Leverage
 "Inside Job", a 2012 episode of Transformers: Prime

Music 

 Inside Job (album), 2000 studio album by Don Henley
 Inside Job, 1980 contemporary Christian album by Dion DiMucci

Songs 

 "Inside Job", song on the 1992 album Little Village (album) by the band of the same name
 "Inside Job", song on the 1998 album 40 Dayz & 40 Nightz by Xzibit
 "Inside Job", song on the 2006 album Pearl Jam (album) by the band of the same name

See also 

 Inside Man (disambiguation)